Téméraire was a cutter aviso of the French Navy, commissioned in Lorient in December 1780.

Career
Built by engineer Arnous-Dessaulsays after plans by Charles Segondat-Duvernet, Téméraire was started in July 1780 in Lorient, and commissioned in December. 

In July 1782,  captured her off Brest. (British sources give the place of capture as 8–9 leagues WSW of Cape Clear.) Téméraire was armed with ten 6-pounder guns and had a crew of 50 men under the command of lieutenant de frégate Le Fer. She was nine days out of Brest and taking dispatches to the combined fleets. Before he struck Le Fer, her commander, threw overboard the dispatches, her logbook and papers, and eight guns. She then arrived at Cork. 

The French recaptured her in 1783 and recommissioned her in the French Royal Navy.

Fate 
Téméraire was struck from the Navy lists in 1784; at that time, she was either in Toulon or in Brest.

Citations and references
Citations

References
 
  (1671-1870)

1780 ships
Cutters of the French Navy
Captured ships